Jamla (also spelled Gamlah, Jumlah, Jamleh or Al Jamlah) is a village in southwestern Syria, administratively part of the Daraa Governorate and immediately east of the Israeli-occupied Golan Heights. It is situated on the eastern slopes of the Wadi Ruqqad valley. Nearby localities include Abdin to the south, the nahiyah ("subdistrict") center of al-Shajara to the southwest, Nafia to the east, Ayn Zakar to the northeast and Saida to the north. According to the Syria Central Bureau of Statistics (CBS), Jamla had a population of 1,916 in the 2004 census. Its inhabitants are predominantly Sunni Muslims.

History
The village likely has an ancient history, indicated by the large stone ruins in the vicinity, including that of a rectangular-shaped building. The area is marked by basaltic mounds called rujm, some of which rise to an elevation between 24 and 30 feet. Atop the summits of the rujm are delineated circles and squares stretching to widths up to 10 feet. These shapes were formed by blocks of rudely carved basaltic rock.

In  the Ottoman  tax registers of 1596, Jamla was located in the nahiya of  Jawlan Sarqi,  Qada of Hawran. It had a population of 7 households and 3  bachelors, all Muslims. They paid a fixed tax-rate of 25% on agricultural products, including  wheat, barley, summer crops,  goats and beehives, in addition to occasional revenues; a total of 2,700 akçes.

In the late 19th-century Jamla was described as an impoverished village of 36 hut-like houses and a population of 160 Muslims. Arable land was relatively scarce, although there was significant pasture areas to the south. Figs and vegetables were cultivated by the residents in fields to the north and the southwest. There was an abundant supply of water deriving from the Ain Hamatah spring which fed a stream that flowed around the village and irrigated its crops. The residents owned the property of Tahunat Jamla, a small mill turned by the Wadi Seisun waterfall.

During the ongoing Syrian civil war, on 6 March 2013, Yarmouk Martyrs Brigade non-FSA-affiliated rebel fighters kidnapped 21 Filipino United Nations peacekeepers patrolling the border between Syria and the Israeli-occupied Golan Heights. The Brigade were reportedly in control of the village itself, but intense clashes were occurring around it. The fighters accused the peacekeepers of cooperating with the Syrian authorities in trying to "push the rebels out of Jamla" and demanded that the Syrian Army withdraw from the vicinity of Jamla in return for their release. They were after several days.

The town remained under the control of the Brigade, who affiliated to ISIL by late 2014. On 15 November 2015, Brigade head Muhammad "Abu Ali" al-Baridi and five other leaders were killed in a bomb blast in Jamla; Al-Nusra Front claimed responsibility for the attack. In late 2015, Jamla was reported to be a stronghold of the Yarmouk Martyrs Brigade. When the Brigade merged into the ISIL-affiliated Khalid ibn al-Walid Army, it maintained control of the city through 2016 and 2017.

On 28 July 2018, the Syrian army recaptured the village of Jamla from Khalid ibn al-Walid Army.

On 21 June 2022, two Syrian soldiers were killed by an IED explosion on a road near the village.

References

Bibliography

External links
Map of the town, Google Maps
Kafer el Ma-map; 21K

Populated places in Daraa District